John Brown most often refers to:
John Brown (abolitionist) (1800–1859), American who led an anti-slavery raid in Harpers Ferry, Virginia, in 1859

John Brown or Johnny Brown may also refer to:

Academia
John Brown (educator) (1763–1842), Irish educator; third president of the University of Georgia
John Carter Brown (1797–1874), American book collector and antiquarian
John Macmillan Brown (1845–1935), Scottish-New Zealand academic, administrator and promoter of education for women
John Nicholas Brown I (1861–1900), American book collector and antiquarian
John Lott Brown (1924–2011), American university administrator and professor
John H. Brown (scholar) (born 1948), American scholar of public diplomacy

Arts and entertainment

Literature
John Brown (historian) (died ), English miscellaneous writer
John Mason Brown (1900–1969), American literary critic
Sir John Gilbert Newton Brown (1916–2003), English book publisher 
John Gregory Brown (born 1960), American novelist
John Brown (American author) (born 1966), American novelist and short story writer

Performing arts
John Brown (actor) (1904–1957), English radio and film actor
Johnny Mack Brown (1904–1974), American film actor and college football player
Johnny Brown (actor) (1937–2022), American actor and singer
John Moulder-Brown (born 1953), English actor
John W. Brown (set decorator) (fl. 1960s–1970s)

Visual arts 
John Brown (artist) (1752–1787), Scottish artist
John Crawford Brown (1805–1867), Scottish landscape painter
John Lewis Brown (1829–1892), French battle, animal, and genre painter
John George Brown (1831–1913), English-born American painter
John William Brown (artist) (1842–1928), English painter and stained glass designer
John Appleton Brown (1844–1902), American painter
John Arnesby Brown (1866–1955), English landscape artist

Business and industry
John Brown (1723–1808), Scottish-Danish merchant and shipowner
John Brown (brewer) (1795–1890), English brewer
John Brown (builder) (1809–1876), Canadian builder
John Brown (coalmine owner) (1850–1930),  coal baron and shipowner in New South Wales, Australia
Sir John Brown (industrialist) (1816–1896), British industrialist; founder of the Atlas steelworks
John Crosby Brown (1838–1909), American banker; partner in Brown Bros. & Co.
John W. Brown (labor leader) (1867–1941), Canadian-born labor leader in the United States
John Brown (trade unionist) (1880/81–1961), British trade union leader and local councillor
John W. Brown (British trade unionist) (1886–?), British activist, general secretary of the International Federation of Trade Unions
John Seely Brown (born 1940), American researcher in organizational studies
John W. Brown (corporate executive) (fl. 1980s–2010s), American executive; president of Stryker Corporation

Military 
John Brown (British Army officer) (died 1762), British Army general
John Brown (British Army soldier) (1908–1965), Royal Artillery quartermaster sergeant and espionage agent
John Brown of Pittsfield (1744–1780), American Revolutionary War officer
John Brown (sailor) (1826–1883), American sailor and Civil War Medal of Honor recipient
John Harties Brown (1834–1905), Canadian soldier who fought in the American Civil War
John Brown (Medal of Honor) (1838–?), American sailor and peacetime Medal of Honor recipient
John H. Brown (Medal of Honor)  (1842–1898), American soldier and Civil War Medal of Honor recipient
John H. Brown Jr. (1891–1963), United States Navy admiral and American football player
John Nicholas Brown II (1900–1979), U.S. Assistant Secretary of the Navy
John Brown Jr. (Navajo) (1921–2009), American Navajo Code Talker during World War II
John Brown (British Army soldier) (–1965), UK spy and POW during World War II
John M. Brown III (fl. 1960s–2000s), United States Army general
John S. Brown (general) (fl. 1970s–2000s), United States Army brigadier general; Chief Historian of the United States Army Center of Military History

Politics and law

Australia 
John Brown (New South Wales politician) (1821–1896), member of the New South Wales Legislative Assembly
John Alexander Voules Brown (1852–1945), member of the South Australian House of Assembly
John Brown (Queensland politician) (1881–1949), blacksmith and member of the Queensland Legislative Assembly
John Brown (Tasmanian politician) (1886–1974), member of the Tasmanian House of Assembly
John Brown (Australian politician) (born 1931), member of the Australian House of Representatives

Canada 
John Brown (Upper Canada politician) (1791–1842), Irish-born Canadian politician
John Lothrop Brown (1815–1887), Canadian political figure in Nova Scotia
John Brown (Richmond Hill politician) (fl. 1870s–1880s), Canadian politician
John Brown (Canadian politician) (1841–1905), member of Parliament
John Cameron Brown (1843–?), Canadian political figure in New Brunswick
John Cunningham Brown (1844–1929), Irish-born political figure in British Columbia
John Brown (Ontario MPP) (1849–1924), member of Ontario assembly and mayor of Stratford, Ontario
John Robert Brown (British Columbia politician) (1862–1947), Canadian politician
John Livingstone Brown (1867–1953), Canadian politician
John G. Brown (1900–1958), Ontario politician
John L. Brown (Ontario politician) (1921–2004), Canadian politician
John Clemence Gordon Brown (fl. 1960s–1970s), Canadian diplomat

United Kingdom 
John Brown (Wales MP) (died c. 1654)
Sir John McLeavy Brown (1835–1926), British lawyer and diplomat
John Wesley Brown (1873–1944), British MP for Middlesbrough East

United States

Kentucky
John Brown (Kentucky politician, born 1757) (1757–1837), U.S. representative and U.S. senator; member of Continental Congress from Virginia
John Y. Brown (politician, born 1835) (1835–1904), Kentucky governor, U.S. representative for Kentucky
John Y. Brown Sr. (1900–1985), U.S. representative for Kentucky
John Y. Brown Jr. (1933–2022), Kentucky governor
John Young Brown III (born 1963), Kentucky Secretary of State

Other U.S. states
John Brown (Rhode Island politician) (1736–1803), U.S. representative, co-founder of Brown University
John Brown (North Carolina politician) (1738–1812), pioneer and statesman
John Brown (Maryland politician) (1760–1815), U.S. representative
John Brown (Pennsylvania politician) (1772–1845), U.S. representative
John Brown (Texas politician) (1786–1852), speaker of the Texas state House of Representatives
John W. Brown (New York politician) (1796–1875), U.S. representative
John Brown (Cherokee chief) (fl. 1830s)
John S. Brown (Michigan politician) (born  1810), Michigan state representative
John Brown (mountain man) (1817–1889), Fur trapper and trader around Pueblo, Colorado from 1841 to 1849.
John Henry Brown (1820–1895), Texas politician, chaired Texas articles of Secession
John C. Brown (1827–1889), Confederate general, Tennessee governor
John S. Brown (Maryland politician), American politician
John Brewer Brown (1836–1898), U.S. representative for Maryland
John Robert Brown (Virginia politician) (1842–1927), U.S. representative
John Brown (Seminole chief) (1842–1919), Seminole chief and Confederate States Army officer
John C. Brown (Ohio politician) (1844–1900), American politician
John T. Brown (1876–1951), Ohio lieutenant governor
John Robert Brown (judge) (1909–1993), member of the U.S. Court of Appeals for the Fifth Circuit
John William Brown (1913–1993), Ohio governor
John Brown Jr. (Navajo) (1921–2009), member of Navajo Tribal Council
John Brown Junior (1821–1895), American abolitionist

Other countries 
John Evans Brown (1827–1895), American-born member of New Zealand parliament

Religion 
John Brown of Priesthill (1627–1685), Scottish Protestant martyr
John Brown (essayist) (1715–1766), English clergyman
John Brown of Haddington (1722–1787), Scottish clergyman and Biblical commentator
John Brown (Vicar of St Mary's, Leicester) (c. 1792–1845), British evangelical preacher
John Brown (minister) (1784–1858), Scottish clergyman and writer
John Newton Brown (1803–1868), Baptist teacher, minister and publisher
John Croumbie Brown (1808–1895), Scottish missionary and forestry pioneer in South Africa
John M. Brown (1817–1852), American bishop in the African Methodist Episcopal church
John Brown (Mormon pioneer) (1820–1897), American Mormon leader
John Brown (writer) (1830–1922), British theologian, historian, and pastor
John Henry Hobart Brown (1831–1888), American Episcopal bishop of Fond du Lac, Wisconsin
John Brown (moderator) (1850–1919), Scottish minister
John E. Brown (1879–1957), American evangelist, founder of John Brown University
John J. Brown (fl. 1915), American Roman Catholic priest and educator
John Brown (bishop) (1931–2011), English Anglican bishop
John Brown of Wamphray (1610–1679), Scottish church leader
John Pierce Brown (1843–1925), Irish Anglican priest

Science and medicine
John Brown (physician, born 1735) (1735–1788), Scottish physician
John Brown (geographer) (1797–1861), English geographer
John Brown (physician, born 1810) (1810–1882), Scottish physician and essayist
John Ronald Brown (1922–2010), unlicensed United States sex-change operation surgeon
John Campbell Brown (1947–2019), Scottish astronomer

Sports

American football
John Brown (center) (1922–2009), American football center and linebacker
John Brown (offensive tackle) (born 1939), American NFL football offensive tackle
John Brown (offensive lineman) (born 1988), American football offensive lineman
John Brown (wide receiver) (born 1990), American NFL football wide receiver
Jon Brown (American football) (born 1992), American NFL football placekicker

Association football
John Brown (footballer, born 1866) (1866–1955), English footballer for Notts County
John Brown (footballer, born 1876) (1876–?), Scottish footballer for Sunderland
John Brown (footballer, born 1887) (1887–1943), footballer for Celtic and Chelsea
John Brown (footballer, born 1888) (1888–?), footballer for Manchester City and Stoke
Jonathan Brown (English footballer) (1893–1918), English footballer
John Brown (footballer, born 1890s), Scottish professional footballer
John Brown (footballer, born 1901) (1901–1977), English footballer for Leicester City and Wrexham
John Brown (1920s footballer), English footballer 
John Brown (footballer, born 1915) (1915–2005), Scottish football player
John Brown (footballer, born 1921) (1921–1989), English professional footballer for York City
John Brown (footballer, born 1935) (1935–2000), Scottish football player
John Brown (footballer, born March 1940), Scottish footballer
John Brown (footballer, born July 1940), English footballer
John Brown (footballer, born 1947), English football goalkeeper
John Brown (footballer, born 1962), Scottish football player and manager

Australian rules football
John Brown (Australian footballer, born 1923) (1923–2007), Australian rules footballer for Carlton
John Brown (Australian footballer, born 1937) (1937–2001), Australian rules footballer for Geelong
John Brown (Australian footballer, born 1944) (1944–2001), Australian rules footballer for Geelong

Basketball
John Brown (basketball, born 1951), American former basketball player in the NBA
John Brown (basketball, born 1992), American basketball player
John Y. Brown Jr. (1933–2022), American basketball owner

Cricket
John Brown (Nottinghamshire cricketer) (1807–1883), English cricketer
John Brown (cricketer, born 1820) (1820–?), English cricketer
John Brown (cricketer, born 1862) (1862–?), English cricketer
Jack Brown (cricketer) (1869–1904), English cricketer
John Brown (cricketer, born 1874) (1874–1950), English cricketer
John Brown (cricketer, born 1890) (1890–1968), English cricketer
John Brown (umpire) (1928–2005), New Zealand Test match umpire

Rugby football
John Blair Brown (1856–1904), Scottish rugby union player
John Alf Brown (1881–1936), Welsh international rugby union player
Johnny Brown (rugby league) (born 1943), Australian rugby league footballer
John Brown (rugby league), New Zealand rugby league player

Other sports
John Brown (1890s pitcher) (1876–1908), American baseball player
John Brown (1940s pitcher) (1918–1999), American baseball player
Jackie Brown (English boxer) or John Brown (1909–1971), English boxer
John Brown (cyclist) (1916–1990), New Zealand cyclist
John Brown (bobsleigh) (born 1935), British Olympic bobsledder
John Brown (bodybuilder) (fl. 1980s), American bodybuilder
John Brown (runner) (fl. 2000s–2010s), British competitor in the 2010 World Long Distance Mountain Running Challenge
John Brown (tennis), Australian sports promoter and tennis player
Jonny Brown (cyclist) (born 1997), American cyclist

Others
John Brown (architect) (1805–1876), British architect
John Brown (fugitive slave) (c. 1810–1876), American author of Slave Life in Georgia: A Narrative of the Life, Sufferings and Escape of John Brown
John Brown (servant) (1826–1883), Scottish servant and close friend of Queen Victoria
John Ednie Brown (1848–1899), Scottish author on sylviculture and state conservator of forests
John Brown (colonist) (died 1879), English colonist in South Australia
John Brown (bridge) (1887–?), English contract-bridge player and author
John A. Brown Jr. (died 1997), American murderer executed in Louisiana for the murder of Omer Laughlin

Other uses

Artistic uses
"John Brown's Body", Union marching song of the American Civil War
John Brown (The Shop Girl), fictional millionaire in The Shop Girl (1894)
John Brown (biography), 1909 biography of the abolitionist by W.E.B. Du Bois
"John Brown" (Bob Dylan song) (1962)
John Brown, fictional sheriff in "I Shot the Sheriff" by Bob Marley (1973)
"John Brown", a song by the Masters of Reality from Masters of Reality (1989)
John Brown, fictional character in Ghost Hunt (1989–1992)
John Brown, fictional physician in Like Water for Chocolate (1992)
John Brown, fictional protagonist of Inspector Gadget (1999)
John Brown's Body (band), an American reggae band

Business and legal uses
Virginia v. John Brown, 1859 trial of the abolitionist
John Brown & Company, shipbuilding company in Clydebank, Scotland
John Brown Media, British magazine publisher
John A. Brown (department store), Oklahoma-based department store chain
John Brown University, college in Siloam Springs, Arkansas

Military uses
John Brown Battery, American volunteer artillery unit in the Lincoln Battalion during the Spanish Civil War
SS John W. Brown, American Liberty ship
SS John W. Brown II, American Victory ship

See also 
John Young Brown (disambiguation)
Jonathan Brown (disambiguation)
John Browne (disambiguation)
Jack Brown (disambiguation)
Jackie Brown (disambiguation)